Chris Catalyst (born 11 February 1980) is a British rock singer-songwriter and musician, best known for his work with The Sisters of Mercy, Ugly Kid Joe, Ginger Wildheart, Terrorvision, The Professionals, Mariachi El Bronx, The Scaramanga Six and his own band, Eureka Machines, as well as his more recent solo career. On 18 May, 2022, Chris confirmed that he has been a 'Nameless Ghoul' that tours with the Swedish metal band Ghost

Chris was born in Beverley in East Yorkshire in 1980 and moved to Leeds in 1998, where he lives now, with his cat Rose.

The Sisters of Mercy

Chris joined The Sisters Of Mercy as rhythm guitarist and backing singer in 2005, quickly forming a tight relationship with lead singer and original member Andrew Eldritch, to the extent that the notoriously fickle Eldritch appointed him as the band manager in 2008.

Despite collaborating with Andrew on the first new Sisters material in almost a decade, in 2019, frustrated with Eldritch’s slow-paced work ethic, and becoming more busy and successful with his own projects, Chris stepped down from the band, but speaking in an interview with Classic Rock magazine in June 2021, he said “I’ll always have respect for Andrew. He just has a different pace of doing things, which I found frustrating, because I like to be busy. That’s his prerogative, but it was tiresome at times. It was like he didn’t really want to do it, and that made it hard to enjoy at times. There was a point where I couldn’t do a tour. Instead of moving it, Andrew saw fit to get someone else in, which was a shame. But there’s no bridges burnt.” Chris remains part of the Sisters family and is rumoured to be working with Andrew Eldritch on another project.

Eureka Machines

In 2007, Chris started the group Eureka Machines, singing and playing guitar again, as well as writing the songs.

Describing the band, Chris said 'it's basically like rock and roll cabaret - a big heap of rock music that makes people smile'. 

Debut album ‘Do Or Die’ was released in September 2008  on the Wrath Records label to widespread critical acclaim, including a five-star review in national newspaper The Sun. 'Do or Die' gained positive reviews from The Sun, Kerrang!, Classic Rock, Rock Sound, Leeds Guide, Sandman magazine, No Title magazine and Black Velvet Fanzine, as well as airplay on BBC Radio 1, BBC 6Music, Xfm, Channel Five, MTV2, Scuzz and various local stations. Chris recorded and mixed the album from his home studio.

It was followed by the second album ‘Champion The Underdog’ in May 2011, which was supported by tours in both the UK and Europe, cementing the band as a formidable live prospect and building a burgeoning fanbase. This was recorded and mixed by Chris and Jason Edwards (Wildhearts/Wolfsbane). The Sun once again awarded a rave review, saying ‘Eureka Machines could be the best band you’ve never heard’.

In 2012, the band appeared in the British soap opera Emmerdale, playing at a fictional music festival, filmed as part of the soap’s 40th birthday celebrations, alongside Scouting For Girls, The Proclaimers and Brendan Croker. It was Chris’s second appearance on Emmerdale, following his 2004 appearance as a Dingle at a family party. The band reverted to crowdfunding for their third release, ‘Remain In Hope’, released following a successful campaign on PledgeMusic in February 2013. This was promoted with tours supporting The Wildhearts and Gogol Bordello. This album was recorded and mixed by Chris and Andy Hawkins (Pulled Apart By Horses/Pigeon Detectives) at Cottage Road in Leeds. 10% of all profits were donated to Chris's friend and collaborator Tim Smith from the band Cardiacs, for his ongoing care in a stroke rehabilitation ward. This raised over £4,000 for the cause.

Fourth album ‘Brain Waves’ followed in May 2015, following another successful PledgeMusic campaign. Heralded by Chris as ‘my favourite Eureka Machines album’, this ended up hitting the UK charts at Number 75, as well as making Number 3 in the rock charts and Number 1 in the Indie Breakers chart. This album was recorded and mixed by Chris and Andy Hawkins (Pulled Apart By Horses/Pigeon Detectives) at The Nave in Leeds. Once again, the band donated 10% of the profits to a good cause, this time picking mental health charity MIND as the beneficiary, donating over £4,000.

In April 2019, Eureka Machines released fifth album ‘Victories’, again appearing on the Wrath Records imprint. This followed yet another victorious PledgeMusic campaign but a mistake with them not registering it for the UK charts meant that, in spite of increased sales from the last album, it did not chart. This time, the band donated 10% of the profits from the album to their friend Scott Sorry (Wildhearts/Amen/Brides Of Destruction) following his diagnosis of brain cancer, which he later recovered from.

This release was augmented by a double-album called ‘Rarities’  which catalogued the band’s unreleased activity over the decade, and the large selection of covers the band have recorded over the years.

Eureka Machines also released a double-disc DVD in 2015, featuring the band’s set from the Brudenell Social Club in November 2014, as well as all of their promo videos and outtakes to date.

Solo career

In January 2017, Chris released his debut solo album, ‘Life Is Often Brilliant’, upon which he performed all of the instruments apart from some piano and keys, which were provided by Willie Dowling and Bryan Scary.

In April 2021, Chris followed this up with ‘Kaleidoscopes’, upon which again he performed all of the instruments apart from the drums, which were provided by Jason Bowld (Bullet For My Valentine/Killing Joke/Pitchshifter). This hit No 3 in the UK Rock Chart and 25 in the Official Album Chart. It was supplemented with videos for Make Good Art (featuring million-selling author Neil Gaiman, who described the track as 'really terrific' ), The Ride and King Of Everything.

Ginger Wildheart/The Wildhearts

In 2005, Chris was invited to support The Wildhearts in the UK and Japan by singer Ginger, as ‘Robochrist’, a techno-metal comedy act he started In 2004. A firm friendship followed, and Ginger asked Chris to perform backing vocals on the album Yoni, recorded with Tim Smith (Cardiacs) and released in January 2007.

This led to Ginger inviting Chris to help record the concept album ‘Market Harbour’ with Tim Smith again and released in January 2008. Chris was involved in the electronics and production, as well as backing vocals.

In 2011, Ginger again invited Chris to write and record on his record-breaking ‘555%’ triple-album, along with Willie Dowling (Honeycrack), Jon Poole (Cardiacs), Fyfe Ewing (Therapy?) and Ritch Battersby (Wildhearts/Grand Theft Audio). The album charted at Number 9 in the UK charts.

2013 saw Chris, Ginger, Jon Poole, Rich Jones, Denzel, Victoria Liedtke and Brian Scary collaborate for the expansive ‘Albion’ album. Another crowd-funded effort, this was described as ‘spine tingling’ and given 4/5 by Classic Rock magazine.

Ginger’s monthly subscription service ‘GASS’ followed and Chris contributed to a number of songs in the studio and remotely.

In 2018, Ginger sustained laryngitis and Chris was asked to step in for him at short notice to sing for The Wildhearts, which he did at Preston Guildhall on 6 October 2018.

In 2021, Chris contributed backing vocals for The Wildhearts' ninth studio album '21st Century Love Songs', which peaked at 9 in the UK Album Charts.

Later that year, Wildhearts guitarist CJ contracted Covid-19, leading the band to ask Chris to step in for him for a number of shows on their '21st Century Love Songs' album tour.

Terrorvision

In 2016, Chris deputised for the absent Milly Evans on keyboards and backing vocals. This was reprised in 2020 and Chris remains Terrorvision’s back-up keyboard player.

Ugly Kid Joe

Having been a touring guitar technician for Californian rockers Ugly Kid Joe on a tour with Skid Row in 2013, Chris formed a fast friendship with singer Whitfield Crane, and when guitarist Sonny Mayo (Snot/Amen) was unavailable for a tour, Chris was asked to step in, performing lead and rhythm guitar for a seven week UK/Europe tour.

The Professionals

In 2017 Chris contributed guitars to the reformed Professionals album ‘What In The World’. This was reprised on the 2021 album ‘SNAFU’, which also featured Billy Duffy (The Cult), Phil Collen (Def Leppard) and Chris McCormack (3 Colours Red). Chris was asked by drummer Paul Cook (Sex Pistols) to join for a tour in Summer 2021, and remains part of The Professionals family.

Ghost

At the end of Ghost's European tour in April 2022, Chris revealed himself on Twitter as one of the bands "Nameless Ghouls". In an end of tour photo shared by Chris he is seen standing next to the bands vocalist Tobias Forge and is quoted as saying "Amaaaazing tour with our wonderful Ghost family. I suppose that’s that particular cat out of the bag.". Chris has been playing the role of rhythm guitarist, Nameless Ghoul 'Aether' since 2017, with the band members previously hidden identities now public.

Other work

Chris deputised on bass guitar for Mariachi El Bronx in 2010 for their absent guitarron player.

Chris also played second drums and keyboards for Huddersfield band The Scaramanga Six from 2004 to 2009, recording the albums The Dance Of Death, Hot Flesh Rumble and Songs Of Prey with Tim Smith (Cardiacs). 

Chris has performed live with Honeycrack/The Grip frontman Willie Dowling, both as a duo playing each other's songs and in Willie's band Jackdaw4.

In 2012, between Sisters Of Mercy tours, Chris became a guitar/backline technician, working for bands including OMD, Marky Ramone, Maximo Park and Skid Row.

During the 2020/21 Covid-19 pandemic, Chris took to YouTube for a series of online acoustic shows, mixing his own songs and a variety of covers with a 'pay what you want' option to raise money for charity, including The Samaritans, Hope Not Hate, Music Venue Trust and MIND. Over the course of the pandemic, this raised over £17,000 for various charities.

References

External links
 Chris Catalyst website
 Eureka Machines website

1980 births
Living people
English rock guitarists
English male guitarists
Alternative rock guitarists
English songwriters
Musicians from Leeds
People from Beverley
The Sisters of Mercy members